David Patterson Dyer (February 12, 1838 – April 29, 1924) was a United States representative from Missouri and a United States district judge of the United States District Court for the Eastern District of Missouri.

Education and career

Born on February 12, 1838, in Henry County, Virginia, Dyer moved with his parents to Lincoln County, Missouri in 1841 and completed preparatory studies.

He attended St. Charles College in Missouri and read law and was admitted to the bar in March 1859, in Bowling Green, Pike County, Missouri. He entered private practice in Pike County, Missouri from 1859 to 1875. He was prosecutor for the Third Judicial Circuit of Missouri in 1860. During the American Civil War, Dyer served as a private in Captain Hardin’s company, Pike County Regiment, Missouri Home Guard, and as lieutenant colonel and colonel in the Forty-ninth Regiment, Missouri Volunteer Infantry. He was a member of the Missouri House of Representatives from 1862 to 1865. He was Secretary of the Missouri Senate in 1866. He was a delegate to the Republican National Convention in 1868.

Congressional service

Dyer was elected as a Republican from Missouri's 9th congressional district to the United States House of Representatives of the 41st United States Congress, serving from March 4, 1869 to March 3, 1871. He was an unsuccessful candidate for reelection in 1870 to the 42nd United States Congress.

Later career

Following his departure from Congress, Dyer resumed private practice in St. Louis, Missouri from 1871 to 1902. He was the United States Attorney for the Eastern District of Missouri from 1875 to 1876, and from March 9, 1902 to March 31, 1907. He was an unsuccessful Republican candidate for Governor of Missouri in 1880.

Federal judicial service

Dyer was nominated by President Theodore Roosevelt on February 27, 1907, to a seat on the United States District Court for the Eastern District of Missouri vacated by Judge Gustavus A. Finkelnburg. He was confirmed by the United States Senate on March 1, 1907, and received his commission the same day. He assumed senior status on November 3, 1919. His service terminated on April 29, 1924, due to his death in St. Louis. He was interred in Bellefontaine Cemetery in St. Louis.

Family

Dyer was the uncle of United States Representatives Leonidas C. Dyer.

References

1838 births
1924 deaths
Republican Party members of the Missouri House of Representatives
Judges of the United States District Court for the Eastern District of Missouri
United States district court judges appointed by Theodore Roosevelt
20th-century American judges
Union Army colonels
Republican Party members of the United States House of Representatives from Missouri
United States Attorneys for the Eastern District of Missouri
People from Lincoln County, Missouri
People from Pike County, Missouri
People from Henry County, Virginia